James Jerome O'Toole (January 10, 1937 – December 26, 2015) was an American professional baseball pitcher. He played in Major League Baseball (MLB) for the Cincinnati Reds and Chicago White Sox during his 10-year career.

College and minor league

After graduating from Chicago's Leo High School, O'Toole attended the University of Wisconsin–Madison. He made his Major League debut with the Reds after only one minor league season, with the 1958 Nashville Vols, where he led the AA Southern Association in wins (20), innings pitched, strikeouts and bases on balls.

Cincinnati Reds
From 1961–64, he won 19, 16, 17 and 17 games for the Cincinnati Reds, from 1961 to 1963 respectively 3rd, tied for 8th, and tied for 10th in the National League. He played a crucial role in Cincinnati's 1961 National League championship, when he won 19 of 28 decisions, with an earned run average of 3.10, second in the National League behind Warren Spahn. 

He was named Player of the Month for September with a 5–0 record, 2.53 ERA, and 37 strikeouts. He finished 10th in MVP voting.  

Though pitching effectively in the 1961 World Series, with an earned run average of 3.00, O'Toole lost his two decisions to Whitey Ford in games 1 and 4, as the New York Yankees bested the Reds in five games. In 1963, he was the starting pitcher of the National League in the Major League Baseball All-Star Game (his only appearance at the Summer Classic), pitching 2 innings and allowing 1 earned run, not involved in the decision. O'Toole later said that being selected as the starting pitcher by San Francisco Giants manager Alvin Dark was one of the proudest moments of his career. 

In 1964, he continued as an elite pitcher, with a career-best earned run average of 2.66, 6th in the National League, and a win-lost percentage of .708, third in the National League behind Sandy Koufax and Juan Marichal, two members of the National Baseball Hall of Fame and Museum.

Chicago White Sox
O'Toole played in Cincinnati until his final season, 1967, spent with his hometown team, the Chicago White Sox, but was ineffective due to arm troubles. O'Toole tried to return with a 1969 expansion team, the Seattle Pilots, but was cut in spring training before the season began.

Personal life
O'Toole married Betty Jane Wall, his high school sweetheart, on July 2, 1960. They had 11 children.

After his baseball career ended, O'Toole had a successful second career in Cincinnati real estate sales and remained active in the community, supporting charities and participating in local events including the 2015 St. Patrick's Day parade where he served as the grand marshal.

O'Toole died on December 26, 2015, from cancer in Cincinnati, Ohio at the age of 78.

References

External links

Retrosheet profile
SABR Biography
Venezuelan Professional Baseball League statistics

1937 births
2015 deaths
Baseball players from Chicago
Deaths from cancer in Ohio
Chicago White Sox players
Cincinnati Redlegs players
Cincinnati Reds players
Leones del Caracas players
American expatriate baseball players in Venezuela
Major League Baseball pitchers
Nashville Vols players
National League All-Stars
Seattle Angels players
Wisconsin Badgers baseball players